Yā Hussain is an Arabic phrase used by Shia Muslims  to invoke the memory or intervention of Hussain ibn Ali. It is especially used in the context of the Mourning of Muharram.

The British in colonial India heard Muslims chanting "Yā Hussain! Yā Hassan!" (a reference to Hussain ibn Ali, brother of Hasan ibn Ali) during the Mourning of Muharram, and approximated it as "Hobson-Jobson", which became a term referring to the similar derivation of an English equivalent for a foreign-language word by adapting English words or names that have a superficial resemblance in sound.

See also

 Descendants of Ali ibn Abi Talib
 Day of Ashura
 Day of Tasu'a
 Sermon of Ali ibn Husayn in Damascus
 Ziyarat Ashura

References

Arabic words and phrases
Islamic terminology
Shia Islam